Antora Peak is a high and prominent mountain summit in the southern Sawatch Range of the Rocky Mountains of North America.

Mountain

Historical names
Antora Mountain
Antora Peak – 1972 
Antero Mountain
Antero Peak

See also

List of mountain peaks of North America
List of mountain peaks of the United States
List of mountain peaks of Colorado

References

External links

Mountains of Colorado
Mountains of Saguache County, Colorado
Rio Grande National Forest
North American 4000 m summits